David Blanchfield (born 24 April 2000) is an Irish hurler who plays for Kilkenny Senior Championship club Bennettsbridge and at inter-county level with the Kilkenny senior hurling team.

Career

Blanchfield first played hurling at juvenile and underage levels with Bennettsbridge before eventually joining the club's senior team. He also played as a schoolboy with St. Kieran's College and won consecutive All-Ireland titles in 2018 and 2019. Blanchfield first appeared on the inter-county scene as a member of the Kilkenny under-20 hurling team that won the Leinster U20HC title in 2019. He was added to the senior team two years later and, after winning National League and Leinster Championship titles, lined out in the 2022 All-Ireland final defeat by Limerick.

Honours

St. Kieran's College
All-Ireland Colleges Senior Hurling Championship: 2018, 2019
Leinster Colleges Senior Hurling Championship: 2019

Kilkenny
Leinster Senior Hurling Championship: 2021, 2022
National Hurling League: 2021
Leinster Under-20 Hurling Championship: 2019

References

2000 births
Living people
Bennettsbridge hurlers
Kilkenny inter-county hurlers